The Aion V is a battery-electric compact crossover SUV produced by Aion, a marque of Guangzhou Automobile Corporation.

Overview
The Aion V was revealed on GAC New Energy's WeChat account on 14 May 2020, announcing that the model would launch on 16 June 2020. It is Aion's third model after the S and LX and the brand's second SUV.

Specifications

The car uses a CATL lithium-ion battery and features Huawei 5G and V2X communication systems.

Multiple color-customizable features are available, including a two-tone paint option and color options for the antenna and spoiler.

Rapid-charging battery
In late September 2021, GAC Aion officially launched a version of the Aion V Plus (previously Aion V) equipped with a battery that charges from 30% to 80% in 10 minutes. That corresponds to a 0-80% charging time of 16 minutes.

The battery capacity is 72.3 kWh, and charging for just 5 minutes adds  of range. The manufacturer refers to this version of the battery as SPEED+.

Additionally, a battery version charging about twice as fast, called SPEED++, was also announced. In this case, charging for 5 minutes is expected to provide  of range. A vehicle using this battery version was demonstrated but has not reached the market so far.

However, such charging speeds require an appropriate charging station. GAC Aion has demonstrated a charging station able to provide 480 kW of power, and announced that a network of such stations will be built in China; as of early October 2021 there is just one such station in Guangzhou.

Sales

Aion V Plus (2021-)
The Aion V Plus was unveiled in September 2021 as an upgraded variant based on the Aion V. The Aion V Plus sports redesigned front and rear end styling and interior while featuring ultrafast charging technology with the battery capable to be charged at up to 880 V with a maximum charge power of 480 kW. Prices ranges between 172,600 and 239,600 Chinese Yuan for the Aion V Plus ($26,775 - $37,165 USD).

Design
The Aion V Plus measures 4,650 mm (182 in) long, 1,920 mm (75 in) wide and 1,720 mm (67 in) tall with 2,830 mm (111 in) between the axles. The front bumper has become simpler, and Aion claims it drew inspiration from Star Wars characters to come up with the new design. For the interior, the digital dashboard and the touch-enabled infotainment system are separate from each other, and the infotainment display measures 15.6 inches in diameter.

Powertrain and range
Power of the Aion V Plus comes from three models of batteries rated from 70 to 95 kilowatt-hours, supporting an NEDC-rated range of 500 and 702 km (310–436 miles). All powertrain variants incorporate two electric motors, while total output ranges from 221 PS (218 hp / 163 kW) in the base spec to 271 PS ((267 hp / 200 kW) in the top spec.

Battery and charging
The vehicle can be charged for 5 minutes to add 200 km to its range and can be charged from 0 to 80 percent in 8 minutes, it claimed. 
The Aion V Plus is the first to support Aion's super multiplier battery technology and the A480 supercharger with up to 480 kW of charging power, which is capable of giving the Aion V Plus a range increase of 207 km (124 miles of range) on a five-minute charge. The battery has a high life span and is capable of remaining at 95 percent even after 1,600 cycles.

Sea also 
 VinFast VF 7

References

GAC Group
V
Electric vehicles
Compact sport utility vehicles
Cars introduced in 2020
Production electric cars